The 1982–83 Serie C1 was the fifth edition of Serie C1, the third highest league in the Italian football league system.

Overview

Serie C1/A
It was contested by 18 teams, and Triestina won the championship. It was decided that Triestina, Padova was promoted to Serie B, and Piacenza, Mestre, Pro Patria, Forlì was demoted in Serie C2.

Serie C1/B
It was contested by 18 teams, and Empoli won the championship. It was decided that Empoli, Pescara was promoted to Serie B, and Livorno, Reggina, Paganese, Latina was demoted in Serie C2.

League standings

Serie C1/A

Serie C1/B

External links
Italy Championship 1982/83 at RSSSF

Serie C1 seasons
3
Italy